= Jiangsu Garden Expo Park =

Tourist spot in Nanjing City, China

Jiangsu Garden Expo Park is a tourist spot, located in Tangshan Street, Nanjing City, Jiangsu Province, China. It was the venue for the 11th Jiangsu Horticultural Expo, covering an area of 3.45 square kilometres. After the expo, the project building was retained and became a large park combining horticultural, cultural, ecological, and educational restoration.

Jiangsu Garden Expo Park was built in July 2018. It was originally an old cement factory, after the natural regeneration and restoration of mines, dungeons, valleys, and suburban areas, Jiangsu Garden Expo Park was completed at the end of 2020. This is a project to restore and attract ethnic minorities to return to mountainous areas abandoned due to excessive mineral exploitation. Exploitation for rapid development without proper environmental protection knowledge has seriously damaged the living environment of the mountainous areas around Nanjing city, even causing environmental pollution by public buildings Karma. abandoned without proper treatment.
